200 km/h in the Wrong Lane, also titled t.A.T.u. in Japan, is the second, and first English-language, studio album by Russian music duo t.A.T.u., released on 10 December 2002, by Interscope Records. It is the duo's first studio album to be associated with Interscope after signing to Universal, the label they signed to in 1998. Due to the duo's lack of English vocabulary, the album was produced and written by producers such as Trevor Horn, Martin Kierszenbaum, Sergio Galoyan, Robert Orton and Ivan Shapovalov, who was placed as the duo's manager and executive producer. 200 km/h lyrically explores themes such as teenage rebellion, love, sexuality, sadness, independence and social rebellion.

The album received mixed reviews from contemporary music critics. Many critics praised the catchiness and production standards, while ambivalent towards the duo's tacky imagery and vocal abilities. Upon its release, it debuted inside the top-ten in many European countries including Denmark, Austria, Finland, and Italy. It became the duo's best-selling album on the US Billboard 200, peaking at 13. The album became the highest selling album in Russia, with estimated shipments of one million copies. They went on to promote the album with their Show Me Love Tour.

One of the three official singles, "All the Things She Said", became one of the most successful singles of the 2000s, charting at the top spot in over 20 countries. The song was responsible for bringing the group to the spotlight, particularly with the accompanying music video, which caused international controversy. "Not Gonna Get Us" and "How Soon Is Now?" charted moderately worldwide. With the sales, they became the first Russian act to have an album charting in many charts worldwide and the second to chart on the US Billboard 200, following Gorky Park in 1989.

Background
Prior to t.A.T.u., Yulia Volkova and Lena Katina had auditioned as members of Neposedy, a group produced by Ivan Shapovalov and his business partner Alexander Voitinskyi. Shapolavov has said the two girls stood out from the rest of those that auditioned; however, 14-year-old Katina was initially the only one chosen for the group. She sang "It Must Have Been Love" and later recorded a demo release of "Yugoslavia" for the "1999 NATO bombing of Yugoslavia". When both Katina and Volkova were cast for the group (under the name 'Taty'), they began to record their first album. Then, in 2001 the duo released "200 Po Vstrechnoy", which became successful in Poland and Russia. While the album was in development, their producer Alexander Voitinskyi left the production, leaving the album unreleased. However, Shapolavov later signed Elena Kiper as the new co-producer and co-writer for the album. With the success, Shapovalov decided to sign the duo to Interscope and its parent Universal at the headquarters in Russia.

The duo started recording the album at Trevor Horn's home studio in London and having some recording sessions in Los Angeles. When the duo were signed and ready for recording, both Volkova and Katina felt it was easy to understand the English language. Volkova stated that Martin Kierszenbaum helped her with pronunciation, while Katina was already speaking English before production of the album. However, during the times recording in studios, Volkova constantly lost her voice.

Recording
Katina commented on the collaborations, saying; "It was great [...] I think he was involved in some translations because we wanted to keep the meaning of the songs, and to keep the structure specifics. I think that Martin [Kierszenbaum] is a little bit of a fan of t.A.T.u, so he was really trying hard to make us big everywhere! We had an opportunity to work with great producer, it was valuable experience. I am talking about Trevor Horn. And in general, just imagine: Two girls are coming from Russia, which is another world compared to the USA, working with a high class producers and writers and management. Everybody is so professional. Working with Martin and Interscope in general brought us to an absolutely different level."

Composition
The music of 200 km/h in the Wrong Lane is derived from a wide variety of pop and dance genres while heavily incorporating different musical styles not being present on their previous Russian record. It encompasses a broad variety of genres, such as electronic, rock, industrial and Eurodance. It is considered that the album is a departure to their Russian debut, because that contained heavy Europop, Eurodance and techno influences. According to Allmusic, t.A.T.u. have been known for "Eurodance, Europop, electronica and pop rock" music through their career. A lot of fans and, surprisingly, critics have applauded their mix of electronica and pop rock styles. According to Discogs, the album is influenced by musical genres of electronic, pop, rock, Europop, pop rock and balladry.

The first track, "Not Gonna Get Us" is a Eurodance-inspired song, with influences of dance-pop and rock. "All the Things She Said" was the first single released and the second track on the album. The song opens with dreamy, trance-gated synthesizers and then shifts into a guitar-based pop rock style with Trevor Horn's trademark huge drum sound. The line "I'm in serious shit, I feel totally lost" in the first verse would be sung normally in live performance; on the album, however, the word is censored and was completely removed in the music video. The third single, "Show Me Love", was released in Poland. The song was described as "neutral". "30 Minutes" was later released as the fourth single. The song has been described as a "slow atmospheric ballad".

"How Soon Is Now?" was the band's last single released from this album and was also the fifth track on the album. It is a cover version of The Smiths song of the same name. The song "is transformed by scorched synths, furious power-chords and Katina or Volkova's defiant roar "You Shut Your Mouth", into an angry punka blast." "Clowns (Can You See Me Now?)" was the sixth track on the album. The song was written by Horn, Ivan Shapolavov and Valery Polienko. It was also scheduled to be the last single, but this plan was scrapped. However, for a promotional release, 200km/h in the Wrong Lane was re-issued in their native Russia under the name t.A.T.u. – Clowns. It has a synthpop and electronica style. "Malchik Gay" (translated to: Gay Boy) is the seventh track on the album. AllMusic named it as an album highlight because the lyrics, which were written by their producers, had received a lot of attention. It is an acoustic song concerning homosexuality. "Stars" is the eighth and final original track on the album. The song "tries for smooth world-pop with an extended Russian rap, but doesn't linger in anyone's memory after it's over."

Title and artwork
The album's title was revealed as 200 km/h in the Wrong Lane, which strikes a similarity to their first album. In a documentary on their DVD Screaming for More, the group revealed that the title of the album was to represent their imagery that was portrayed through the media and that the album represented a "dangerous" side to them. Katina also said of Volkova's dangerous driving that inspired the title.

The artwork and photoshoot off the album was shot by Sheryl Nields. There are three official covers to the album. The international version featured both Volkova and Katina leaning on a motorbike, with Katina leaning on Volkova. The Japanese version was shot with the duo in catholic school uniforms similar to the clothes they wore in the "All the Things She Said" video. Because the album issued music videos, a "G" rating was issued on the cover off the album physically. The 10th Anniversary Edition takes the artwork off "All the Things She Said" and uses the group's music videos to illustrate the border of the cover.

Promotion

Media portrayal
When the music video of "All the Things She Said" was released in August 2002, it created an immediate media storm due to the lesbian kiss between the members. The subject matter caused universal controversy, with many media outlets calling it one of the most controversial videos to date. Media outlets, including MuchMusic, FHM Music TV, Virgin Media and The Guardian have regarded it as either a "sexy" or "controversial" music video. William Leith, a publicist from The Guardian, published a separate article on how lesbianism never fails to appeal upon men. Leith commented; "the BBC ban on tATu's video, the fact that their manager, Ivan Shapovalov, has said some dodgy things about his marketing strategies, and that Richard and Judy have advised people not to buy the record. But the thing that really starts the conversation going is the mention of lesbianism." He revealed that "So, here we go again. Lesbians! Phwoar! Eyebrows are raised. Sly grins are exchanged. The subject, clearly, is fascinating to us. We approve of it."

After their manager admitted to portraying the girls as lesbians to market their music and aimed t.A.T.u. to create a sexual imagery for men who enjoy pornography, media outlets had criticized him and t.A.T.u. Child protection charity had branded the group "disgusting and pathetic" and said that child pornography is not a laughing matter. ITV banned the video from its show CD:UK, as producer Tammy Hoyle responded "We could not show the video on CD:UK because it is not really suitable for children." Despite banning the video, the group performed the song on many live performances including MTV, Top of the Pops and many more.

Reviews on the group's image were immensely harsh; AllMusic review for 200 km/h in the Wrong Lane labelled the band as a tawdry gimmick. A writer from The Daily Telegraph expressed the video as "clichéd", while it "titillating on a very base and adolescent level, only serves to cheapen the song's lyrical impact. The video is also a sign of how blurred the line between entertainment and exploitation has become".

Tour
The group's Show Me Love Tour was originally commenced in early 2003. In March 2003, the group announced dates for their "Show Me Love Promo Tour" in the United Kingdom. However the next month, the group dropped the dates and did not perform at the concert, due to poor ticket sales. The concert was just days after the cancellation. BBC News stated that only a fraction of the tickets were sold for the concert and said the stadiums (held in London and Manchester) had around capacities of 10,000. A spokesman from their label Interscope did not understand why the cancellation took place.

In May 2003, t.A.T.u.'s management were sued by the promoters EEM Group for the cancellations of the concerts. EEM sued their management for £300,000, claiming they put "unachievable and numerous obstacles" in the way of ticket sales for the shows. They also claimed that Yulia's illness was a reason for the cancellation, however due to the lack of evidence, the lawsuit was discarded. After the lawsuit, the group also cancelled their Asian-promo tour for Japan and China, due to Yulia's sickness, who needed urgent surgery. The same month, the group postponed their German Promo tour, due to a late invitation to the 2003 MTV Movie Awards, where they performed. The following month they also cancelled their Riga concert and Japan concert in June, which led to a lawsuit from Pasadena Group Promotion, asking $180,000 in damages, as they did not receive any official letters regarding the cancellation.

Live performances
Despite tour cancellations, the group performed in many associations. To promote "All the Things She Said", t.A.T.u. performed the song on many television shows in the United States. They first appeared on The Tonight Show with Jay Leno, where the girls created confusion, because they kissed each other without first having been granted permission to do so. They performed the single on Jimmy Kimmel Live!, AOL sessions, MADtv, Carson Daly Show, TRL and the 2003 MTV Movie Awards. They also performed the song on shows in many other countries such as CD:UK in the UK and Top of the Pops in Italy.

Singles
"All the Things She Said" was released as the first single off the album in August 2002. It initially received mixed reception, praising the catchiness and creativeness, while criticizing the repetition. The song topped many charts around the world, including Australia, Germany, France, New Zealand and the United Kingdom. The song peaked at number twenty on the US Billboard Hot 100, becoming the highest Russian act to do so. The song was directed by their manager Ivan Shapovalov, with the girls in school uniforms kissing.

"Not Gonna Get Us" was released in May 2003 by Interscope Records, both physically and digitally. It was met with favorable reception, praising their departure from their first single and felt it was radio-friendly. The video was also shot by Shapolavov, where it features the girls escaping a supposed prison-like environment and escaping in a construction truck.

"Ne Ver', Ne Boysia" was used as the official Russian entry to the 2003 Eurovision Song Contest. Released as a promotional single in May 2003, the song came third in the competition, only because of the lack of voting opportunity from the United Kingdom and Ireland.

"Show Me Love" and "30 Minutes" were both released promotionally in Europe, not managing to receive success critically or commercially. Music video's for each single were released though, with "30 Minutes" receiving controversy due to nudity.

"How Soon Is Now?", A cover from The Smiths was the final single from the studio album. The song received mixed reviews, praising the potential while criticizing the production and the duos vocal abilities. The song managed to chart moderately around Europe and Australia.

Critical reception

200 km/h in the Wrong Lane received mixed reviews from contemporary music critics. Entertainment.ie gave it a favorable review, awarding it three stars. They had said "A teenage lesbian duo from Russia may sound like a marketing man's fantasy rather than a living, breathing pop band." and finished saying "Tatu's novelty value won't, of course, last forever. But for now, they're as entertaining as anyone in mainstream chart music." Michael Osborn from MusicOMH was positive, saying "Short it may be, but TATU's initial English language offerings are fresh-sounding pop songs of such a high pedigree, that this is an album which will be played to death." They later talked about the girls being on top headlines about the controversy and he stated "Ignore all the headlines - this intriguing Russian act has the ability to hit all the right notes with their music alone, and have more than just one mammoth smash to offer." David Merryweather from Drowned in Sound called the album "the first pop masterpiece of the year" and encouraged people "Don't pretend you don't care."

However, Stephen Thomas Erlewine from AllMusic rated the album two stars out of five, first calling the band a marketing gimmick, and adding that the songs could not be fun due to leaning on "heavy, portentous Europop, badly sung by two cute girls with annoying squawks for voices." He ended by saying "With those relentless, gloomy beats and those voices that cut against the grain, it's easy to concentrate on nothing but the gimmick, because it's more fun to talk about Russian teenage lesbians than listen to this noisy, oppressive murk." 
Todd Burns from Stylus Magazine awarded the album with a D rating, and gave it a mixed review. He said "It's obviously pop product and probably not worth the money to buy, but certainly essential pop listening if only for the already European released singles." However, he was positive towards the single releases, calling them "phenomenal confectionary pop constructions."

Commercial performance
In the United States, the album debuted at number thirty-six on the chart. The album then rose to thirteen, selling 51,000 copies in its second week becoming the best-gaining sales of that week end. staying in the charts for thirty-three weeks in total. In October 2005, the album sold 760,000 copies in North America, according to Nielsen Soundscan. As of a 2012 Niselen SoundScan update, the album has sold 831,000 copies there, becoming the group's best selling album there and was certified gold by Recording Industry Association of America (RIAA) for shipments of 500,000 copies.

The album debuted at number nineteen on the Australian Albums Chart on 30 March 2003, the highest debut of that week. It remained in the top forty until its tenth week, where it dropped to forty-four and stayed for eleven runs. The album entered at number nine on the New Zealand Albums Chart, becoming the second highest charting album of that week and the group's only top ten studio album. The album descended all its way to number thirty-eight and stayed at total of twelve runs through the chart. In Japan, the album sold more than 300,000 copies in just two days, making them the most successful Eastern European act to have the most sales in a week. As of 2010, the album has sold over 5 million copies worldwide.

10th Anniversary Edition 
In October 2012, the group's previous record labels Interscope and Cherrytree Records announced they would be re-releasing the album under the name 200 km/h in the Wrong Lane: 10 Year Anniversary Edition, as recognition of a ten-year anniversary from the original version. The album contains a new song entitled "A Simple Motion", which is the English version of their Russian single, "Prostye Dvizheniya". 
Back in 2008, there was an interview with the duo where they said that there is still an English version of "Prostye Dvizheniya", but it remained unreleased. This song is the original 2002 version that was never released.

The album is remastered along with new remixes as well as the explicit versions of "All the Things She Said", "Show Me Love" and the extended version of "Show Me Love". The album features a new artwork that was taken from the 2002 era and was released with a parental advisory sticker on 12 November 2012. Not long after its announcement, new artwork was released on the Cherrytree website. On 17 September 2012, just two months before the announcement, the album was already released on the iTunes Store digitally.

Track listing

Personnel
 Lena Katina – vocals
 Yulia Volkova – vocals
 Martin Kierszenbaum – arranger, producer, A&R
 Cindy Cooper – production coordination
 Sheryl Nields – photography
 Trevor Horn – arranger, producer
 Robert Orton – arranger, mixing, engineer, producer
 Bob Ludwig – mastering
 Sergio Galoyan – producer, composer
 Dean Beckett – package co-ordinator (10th anniversary edition)
 Greg Benninger – package design (10th anniversary edition)

Charts

Weekly charts

Monthly charts

Year-end charts

Certifications and sales

References

2002 debut albums
Albums produced by Ivan Shapovalov
Albums produced by Martin Kierszenbaum
Albums produced by Robert Orton (audio engineer)
Albums produced by Trevor Horn
Interscope Records albums
Polydor Records albums
T.A.T.u. albums
Albums produced by Fernando Garibay
LGBT-related albums